Luis Eduardo Barros Cavalcanti (born 9 July 1981), known as Dado Cavalcanti, is a Brazilian professional football coach and former player who played as a left back. He is the current head coach of Náutico.

Early life
Born in Arcoverde and raised in Caruaru, Cavalcanti joined Santa Cruz's youth setup in 1997, aged of 17. Released in 2000, he moved to Naútico, but failed to impress.

Coaching career
Cavalcanti began his career after an invitation from Muricy Ramalho, at that time Náutico first-team trainer, and subsequently joined the youth team's staff. In 2006, after a year as Sport's assistant, he was appointed head coach of Ulbra Ji-Paraná, and went on to win two consecutive Campeonato Rondoniense titles with the club.

Cavalcanti subsequently took over Brazsat FC during the 2008 season, winning the year's Campeonato Brasiliense Terceira Divisão. He subsequently joined Santa Cruz; initially an assistant to Lori Sandri, he became first-team coach after the latter's dismissal in early 2010.

Cavalcanti left Santa in July 2010, and was named América-RN head coach on 13 September. Despite failing to avoid relegation, he remained in charge of the club until the following March, when he was dismissed.

Cavalcanti subsequently managed Central, Icasa, Ypiranga-PE and Luverdense in the following two years, winning the Campeonato Mato-Grossense with the latter. Ahead of the 2013 season, he was appointed Mogi Mirim head coach, taking the club to the semifinals of the year's Campeonato Paulista and being named the best head coach of the tournament.

On 6 May 2013, Cavalcanti was named head coach of Paraná. On 13 December, he was appointed head coach of state rivals Coritiba for the 2014 campaign, but was sacked the following 31 March after being knocked out of the Campeonato Paranaense.

On 13 April 2014, Cavalcanti took over Ponte Preta in the place of departing Vadão, but was relieved from his duties on 21 July. On 12 August, he was named in charge of first club Náutico, leading the club to a 13th position in the Série B.

On 2 December 2014, Cavalcanti was announced as the new head coach of fellow second division side Ceará, being fired the following 12 February with only nine games in charge. Late in the month, he took over Paysandu; he won the 2016 Campeonato Paraense and the 2016 Copa Verde, but was sacked on 7 June 2016.

On 1 August 2016, however, Cavalcanti was again appointed head coach of Paysandu, remaining in charge of the club until the end of the campaign. On 2 December he was named at the helm of Náutico, but left the club on 16 February of the following year. He subsequently managed CRB, only lasting three months in charge.

Cavalcanti returned to Paysandu on 13 February 2018, but was sacked on 12 July. On 17 October, he returned to Paraná, with the club seriously threatened with relegation.

Cavalcanti was sacked from Paraná on 2 April 2019, and was subsequently named head coach of Bahia's under-23 squad late in the month. He left the club in the following April to take over Ferroviária, but was sacked on 1 October.

On 26 October 2020, shortly after being dismissed by Ferroviária, Cavalcanti returned to Bahia as a youth football coordinator. On 21 December, he was named first team head coach after the departure of Mano Menezes.

Cavalcanti won the 2021 Copa do Nordeste with Bahia, but was sacked on 17 August of that year after a poor form in the league. On 22 December, he was named head coach of rivals Vitória for the ensuing campaign.

After finishing in the fifth position in the 2022 Campeonato Baiano, Cavalcanti was replaced by Geninho on 17 March 2022. On 15 May, he returned to the second level after being named head coach of Vila Nova, but was sacked on 2 July after nine winless matches.

On 21 August 2022, Cavalcanti returned to Náutico after five years.

Coaching statistics

Honours

Manager
Ulbra Ji-Paraná
Campeonato Rondoniense: 2006, 2007

Santa Cruz
Copa Pernambuco: 2009

Luverdense
Campeonato Mato-Grossense: 2012

Paysandu
Campeonato Paraense: 2016, 2018
Copa Verde: 2016, 2018

Bahia
Copa do Nordeste: 2021

Individual
Best head coach of Campeonato Pernambucano: 2010
Best head coach of Campeonato Paulista: 2013

References

External links

 

1981 births
Living people
Sportspeople from Pernambuco
Brazilian footballers
Association football defenders
Brazilian football managers
Campeonato Brasileiro Série A managers
Campeonato Brasileiro Série B managers
Campeonato Brasileiro Série C managers
Campeonato Brasileiro Série D managers
Santa Cruz Futebol Clube players
Clube Náutico Capibaribe players
Santa Cruz Futebol Clube managers
América Futebol Clube (RN) managers
Central Sport Club managers
Associação Desportiva Recreativa e Cultural Icasa managers
Luverdense Esporte Clube managers
Mogi Mirim Esporte Clube managers
Paraná Clube managers
Coritiba Foot Ball Club managers
Associação Atlética Ponte Preta managers
Clube Náutico Capibaribe managers
Ceará Sporting Club managers
Paysandu Sport Club managers
Clube de Regatas Brasil managers
Associação Ferroviária de Esportes managers
Esporte Clube Bahia managers
Esporte Clube Vitória managers
Vila Nova Futebol Clube managers